Sankt Nikola an der Donau (also St. Nikola an der Donau) is a municipality in the district of Perg in the Austrian state of Upper Austria.

Geography
Sankt Nikola lies in the Mühlviertel. About 53 percent of the municipality is forest, and 33 percent is farmland.

Population

References

Cities and towns in Perg District